Cathedral College Wangaratta is an independent Anglican co-educational primary and secondary day school, located in Wangaratta, Victoria, Australia. Established in 2003, the school caters for students from Prep to Year 12. The motto of the college is "Truth and Service" which can be found on the school crest.

The current principal of Cathedral College Wangaratta is Nick Jones. The current Vice-Principal of Cathedral College is Anne Harris.

Overview 
In 1998, Cathedral College joined the Anglican Schools Commission. It was the first Anglican school to join that was not from Western Australia. Since then, several other local schools have become part of the Anglican Schools Commission, including Trinity College Albury and Cobram Anglican Grammar School.

Cathedral College phased out "The Close" senior campus in favour of a single, unified campus catering for years Prep to 12. This was effective as of the first day of school term for the 2015 school year. The school now has 535 students from Prep to Year 12 that are all housed on the "Murdoch Road" campus. Cathedral College was also ranked in the Nation's Top 50 Country Schools.

See also
 List of non-government schools in Victoria
 Anglican education in Australia

References

Anglican secondary schools in Victoria (Australia)
Educational institutions established in 2003
2003 establishments in Australia
Anglican primary schools in Victoria (Australia)
Wangaratta